This is list of events in India in year 1627.

Events
 Mohammed Adil Shah becomes Ruler of Bijapur, Karnataka following the death of Ibrahim Adil Shah II.
 Gol Gumbaz, Karnataka begins.

Deaths
 Abdul Rahim Khan-I-Khana poet (born 1556)
 Ibrahim Adil Shah II, later king of Bijapur Sultanate (born 1556)

See also

 Timeline of Indian history

References 

 
India
Years of the 17th century in India